The Walls of Freedom is a 1978 Swedish drama film directed by Marianne Ahrne. It was entered into the 11th Moscow International Film Festival.

Cast
 Torgny Anderberg as Head Waiter
 Britta Billsten as Spastic Woman
 Karin Biribakken as Singing girl on train
 Anders Börje as Singer at Hasselbacken
 Harry Carlson as Swedish-American
 Renzo Casali as Sergio
 Gösta Engström as Svenne
 Curt Ericson as Drunk
 Svante Grundberg as Waiter
 Olle Grönstedt as Train Conductor
 Vivian Gude as Elev
 Krister Henriksson as Svante

References

External links
 
 

1978 films
1978 drama films
Swedish drama films
1970s Swedish-language films
1970s Swedish films